is a 1973 Japanese Anthology television series created by Tsuburaya and Fuji TV to air on the Fuji TV network on Monday Nights for 13 episodes.

Originally started in production in 1969, it was shelved and took years for its airing debut to begin its broadcast, before production was eventually completed at the end of 1972. It was then aired on Fuji TV in 1973.

Episode list
  (1/8/1973)
  (1/15/1973)
  (1/22/1973)
  (1/29/1973)
  (2/5/1973)
  (2/12/1973)
  (2/19/1973)
  (2/26/1973)
  (3/5/1973)
  (3/12/1973)
  (3/19/1973)
  (3/26/1973)
  (4/2/1973)

DVD Releases
In 2007, Victor Entertainment released 6 Volume DVDs of the series, and in 2010, A Boxset that contains all 6 Volumes of the DVD set was released.

See also
Ultra Q
The Twilight Zone
Night Gallery

References

External links

Digital Ultra Series Link

1973 Japanese television series debuts
1973 Japanese television series endings
Tsuburaya Productions
Japanese science fiction television series
Thriller television series
Japanese horror fiction television series
Fuji TV original programming
Japanese anthology television series